The Board of Intermediate and Secondary Education, Larkana (BISE Larkana) is an educational board located in Larkana, Sindh, Pakistan.

Jurisdiction 
The jurisdiction of Larkana Board includes following districts:

 Larkana District
 Kamber and Shahdad Kot District
 Shikarpur District
 Jacobabad District
 Kashmore District

See also 
List of educational boards in Pakistan
Federal Board of Intermediate and Secondary Education

External links
BISE Larkana official website

Education boards in Sindh